The Jordan EJ12 was the car with which the Jordan team competed in the  Formula One season. The car was driven by Giancarlo Fisichella and Takuma Sato.

The EJ12 incorporates heavy design revisions to the front of the chassis, therefore requiring a re-packaged front suspension system. New materials and production techniques have been utilised in the chassis to further reduce weight and the centre of gravity position, with the revised side-pods making the side impact structures smaller, but more efficient.

Due to a drop in sponsorship money the team slipped backwards. Fisichella often exceeded the car's abilities in qualifying, a sixth place on the grid for Montreal surprising many onlookers. Yet results-wise, the Italian had to make do with a trio of fifth places and a final point from Hungary. Sato showed flashes of speed, but managed just two points, at Suzuka. Despite the drop in form, Jordan still managed sixth in the championship with nine points, ahead of BAR.

Complete Formula One results
(key) (results in bold indicate pole position)

References

External links

Technical details for the Jordan EJ12

Jordan Formula One cars
2002 Formula One season cars